Sticta pseudohumboldtii is a species of foliose lichen in the family Peltigeraceae. It is found in the Colombian Andes.

Taxonomy

The species epithet refers to its resemblance to Sticta humboldtii, but with the added Greek prefix "pseudo," meaning "false." This is because, unlike the similarly named S. parahumboldtii, S. pseudohumboldtii is not the closest relative to S. humboldtii. Rather, it is a sister species to the morphologically distinct S. arachnofuliginosa.

In a time-calibrated chronogram of the phylogeny of the genus Sticta, Sticta pseudohumboldtii was most closely related to S. arachnofuliginosa; these two species comprise a clade with a sister relationship to S. atlantica.

Habitat and distribution

Sticta pseudohumboldtii is found in the Colombian Andes. This species is known to grow epiphytically and has been found in all three major Cordilleras. Sticta pseudohumboldtii is commonly associated with Metzgeria spp., Heterodermia circinalis, Leptogium spp., and Oropogon bicolor.

References

pseudohumboldtii
Lichen species
Lichens described in 2013
Lichens of Colombia
Taxa named by Robert Lücking